This is a list of top international male doubles tennis players, both past and present.

It includes players who have won a Grand Slam or Olympic doubles title; or have been officially ranked world no. 1 in doubles.

Players who have won more than one Grand Slam doubles title or have been ranked world no. 1 in doubles are in bold. Players who are still active on the tour are in italics.

List

{|class="sortable wikitable"
!width="160"|Name!!Birth!!Death!!Nationality!! !!Criteria for inclusion
|- id=A
|||1970||–|| South Africa|| ||2 Grand Slam mixed doubles titles → 1999 Australian Open champion, partnering Mariaan de Swardt • 2000 French Open champion, partnering de Swardt
|-
|||1965||–|| South Africa|| ||2 Grand Slam doubles titles → 1990 Australian Open champion, partnering Danie Visser • 1990 U.S. Open champion, partnering Visser • ranked doubles world no. 1 for 19 weeks → 17 weeks in 1990 and 2 in 1991
|-
|||1880||1969|| United States|| 1961 ||6 Grand Slam doubles titles → 1907, 1908, 1909, 1910 and 1917 U.S. National Championships winner, partnering Harold Hackett for the first four and then Harold Throckmorton • 1908 Australasian Championships winner, partnering Alfred Dunlop
|-
|||1951||–|| Australia|| ||2 Grand Slam doubles titles → 1975 Australian Open champion, partnering Phil Dent • 1982 Australian Open champion, partnering John Fitzgerald
|-
|||1904||1977|| United States|| 1963 ||1 Grand Slam singles title → 1935 United States champion, 1934 finalist • 1930 Wimbledon singles finalist • ranked amateur world no. 4 in 1932 and 1935
|-
|||1954||–|||| || 1 Grand Slam doubles title → 1980 French Open doubles champion, partnering Hank Pfister 
|-
|||1953||–|||| ||1973 and 1981 Wimbledon quarterfinalist • 1973 and 1974 U.S. Open quarterfinalist 
|-
|||1894||1973|| Australia|| 2013 ||  2 Grand Slam doubles titles → 1922 Wimbledon champion, partnering Randolph Lycett • 1925 Australasian champion, partnering Norman Brookes
|-
|||1935||–|| Australia|| 2000 ||  2 Grand Slam doubles titles → 1957 French champion, partnering Ashley Cooper • 1973 Australian Open doubles champion, partnering John Newcombe
|-
|||1963||–|||| ||  1 Grand Slam doubles title → 1985 Australian Open champion, partnering Christo van Rensburg
|-
|||1964||–|||| || 1 Grand Slam mixed doubles title → 1981 French Open champion with Andrea Jaeger.
|-
|||1943||1993|||| 1985 ||  2 Grand Slam doubles titles → 1971 US Open champion with Marty Riessen • 1977 Australian Open (Jan.) champion, partnering Tony Roche
|-
|||1932||–|||| || 1 Grand Slam mixed doubles title → 1956 French Championships with Thelma Coyne Long.
|- id=B
|||1872||1931|| Great Britain|| ||  4 Grand Slam doubles titles → 1891, 1894, 1895 and 1896 Wimbledon champion, partnering his twin Wilfred Baddeley
|-
|||1872||1929|| Great Britain|| 2013 || 4 Grand Slam doubles → 1891, 1894, 1895 and 1896 Wimbledon champion, partnering his twin Herbert Baddeley
|-
|||1873||1943|| Great Britain|| || 3 Grand Slam doubles titles → 1909, 1912 and 1923 Wimbledon champion • 1908 Olympic gold medalist singles
|-
|||1941||–|||| || 1 Grand Slam doubles title → 1970 French Open champion, partnering Nikola Pilić
|-
|||1962||–|| Great Britain|| ||  2 Grand Slam mixed doubles titles → 1987 Wimbledon champion, partnering Jo Durie • 1991 Australian Open champion, partnering Durie
|-
|||1967||–|| Germany|| 2003 ||  1 Olympic doubles gold medal → 1992 Barcelona gold medalist, partnering Michael Stich
|-
|||1981||–|||| ||  1 Grand Slam doubles title → 2014 French Open champion, partnering Édouard Roger-Vasselin • 2006 French Open singles quarterfinalist • ranked world no. 25 in 2014
|-
|||1925||2008|| Sweden|| ||  1 Grand Slam doubles title → 1948 French champion, partnering Jaroslav Drobný
|-
|||1914||1994|||| || 2 Grand Slam doubles titles → 1936, 1946 French champion •  2 Grand Slam mixed doubles title → 1935, 1936 French champion
|-
|||1974||–|||| || 4 Grand Slam doubles titles → 1999 and 2001 French Open champion, both partnering Leander Paes • 1999 Wimbledon champion, partnering Paes • 2002 U.S. Open champion, partnering Max Mirnyi • ranked doubles world no. 1 for 4 weeks, in 1999 — 8 Grand Slam mixed doubles titles → 1997 and 2012 French Open champion, partnering Rika Hiraki and Sania Mirza • 1999 and 2005 U.S. Open champion, partnering Ai Sugiyama and Daniela Hantuchová respectively • 2002 and 2005 Wimbledon champion, partnering Likhovtseva and Mary Pierce respectively • 2006 and 2009 Australian Open, partnering Martina Hingis and Sania Mirza respectively
|-
|||1972||–|| Sweden|| ||  8 Grand Slam doubles titles → 1998, 1999 and 2001 Australian Open champion, partnering Jacco Eltingh, Patrick Rafter, Todd Woodbridge respectively • 2004 and 2005 French Open champion, both partnering Max Mirnyi • 2002, 2003 and 2004 Wimbledon champion, all partnering Woodbridge • ranked doubles world no. 1 for 74 weeks → for 43 weeks in 2004 and 31 in 2005
|-
|||1969||–|| Zimbabwe|| ||  1 Grand Slam doubles title → 1994 French Open champion, partnering Jonathan Stark • ranked doubles world no. 1 for 8 weeks, in 1994
|-
|||1973||–|| Zimbabwe|| ||  2 Grand Slam doubles titles → 2001 U.S. Open champion, partnering Kevin Ullyett • 2005 Australian Open champion, partnering Ullyett
|-
|||1985||–|| Italy|| ||  1 Grand Slam doubles title → 2015 Australian Open champion, partnering Fabio Fognini
|-
|||1898||1994|||| 1976 ||  10 Grand Slam doubles titles → 1925, 1928, 1929, 1934 and 1936 French champion, partnering René Lacoste, Jacques Brugnon, Lacoste, Brugnon and Marcel Bernard respectively • 1925, 1932 and 1933 Wimbledon champion, Lacoste, Brugnon and Brugnon respectively • 1928 Australian champion, partnering Brugnon — 5 Grand Slam mixed doubles titles → 1925 Wimbledon champion, partnering Suzanne Lenglen • 1926 United States champion, partnering Elizabeth Ryan • 1927 and 1934 French champion, partnering Marguerite Brocquedis and Colette Rosambert respectively • 1928 Australian champion, partnering Daphne Akhurst
|-
|||1908||2003|||| ||  1 Grand Slam mixed doubles title → 1935 Australian champion, partnering Louie Bickerton
|-
|||1918||1999|| Australia|| 1984 ||  13 Grand Slam doubles titles → 1938, 1939, 1946, 1947, 1948, 1949 and 1950 Australian champion, all partnering Adrian Quist • 1939, 1949 and 1959 U.S. National champion, partnering Quist, Bill Sidwell and Frank Sedgman respectively • 1948 and 1950 Wimbledon champion, partnering Sedgman and Quist respectively — 4 Grand Slam mixed doubles titles → 1938 Australian champion, partnering Margaret Wilson • 1947 and 1948 Wimbledon champion, partnering both partnering Louise Brough • 1948 U.S. National champion, partnering Brough
|-
|||1877||1968|| Australia|| 1977 ||  4 Grand Slam doubles titles → 1907 and 1914 Wimbledon champion, both partnering Anthony Wilding • 1919 United States champion, partnering Gerald Patterson • 1924 Australian champion, partnering James Anderson — at least 1 Grand Slam mixed doubles title → 1907 Wimbledon mixed doubles champion
|-
|||1922||2011|||| ||1946 United States finalist • 1947 Wimbledon finalist, 1946 semifinalist, 1948 quarterfinalist
|-
|||1895||1978|||| 1976 ||  10 Grand Slam doubles titles → 1926, 1928, 1932 and 1933 Wimbledon champion, partnering Henri Cochet for the first two and Jean Borotra for the latter two • 1927, 1928, 1930, 1932 and 1934 French champion, partnering Cochet for the first three and Borotra for the last two • 1928 Australian champion, partnering Borotra — 2 Grand Slam mixed doubles titles → 1925 and 1926 French champion, both partnering Suzanne Lenglen
|-
|||1978||–|||| ||  15 Grand Slam doubles titles, all partnering his twin Mike Bryan → 2003/2013 French Open champion • 2005/2008/2010/2012 U.S. Open champion • 2006/2007/2009/2010/2011/2013 Australian Open champion • 2006/2011/2013 Wimbledon champion • 2003 and 2004 Master's champions, both partnering Mike • with Mike co-ranked doubles world no. 1 for 274 weeks (and counting) → for 6 weeks in 2003, 18 in 2004, 8 in 2005, 52 in 2006, 41 in 2007, 45 in 2008, 33 in 2009, 27 in 2010, 46 weeks in 2011 (and counting)  — 5 Grand Slam mixed doubles titles → 2003, 2004 and 2006 U.S. Open champion, partnering Katarina Srebotnik, Vera Zvonareva and Martina Navratilova respectively • 2008 French Open champion, partnering Victoria Azarenka • 2008/2012 Wimbledon champion, partnering Samantha Stosur and Lisa Raymond respectively.See also: The Bryan brothers
|-
|||1978||–|||| ||  15 Grand Slam doubles titles, all partnering his twin Bob Bryan → 2003/2013 French Open champion • 2005/2008/2010/2012 U.S. Open champion • 2006/2007/2009/2010/2011/2013 Australian Open champion • 2006/2011/2013 Wimbledon champion • 2003 and 2004 Masters champion, both partnering Bob • with Bob co-ranked doubles world no. 1 for 274 weeks (and counting) → for 6 weeks in 2003, 18 in 2004, 8 in 2005, 52 in 2006, 41 in 2007, 45 in 2008, 33 in 2009, 27 in 2010, 46 weeks in 2011 (and counting) — 2 Grand Slam mixed doubles → 2002 U.S. Open champion, partnering Lisa Raymond • 2003 French Open champion, partnering RaymondSee also: The Bryan brothers
|-
|||1915||2000|||| 1964 ||  6 Grand Slam singles titles → 1937 and 1938 Wimbledon champion, 1935 and 1936 semifinalist • 1937 and 1938 United States champion, 1936 finalist, 1935 quarterfinalist • 1938 French champion • 1938 Australian champion • rated amateur world no. 1 for 4 years, 1937 through 1940
|- id=C
|||1871||1953|| United States|| 1955 || 3 Grand Slam doubles titles → 1888, 1891 and 1892 United States champion, partnering Valentine G. Hall, Bob Huntington and Huntington again respectively
|-
|||1951||–|||| ||2 Grand Slam doubles titles → 1974 Australian Open champion, partnering Geoff Masters • 1977 Wimbledon champion with Masters.
|-
|||1875||1955|||| 1961 || 1 Grand Slam doubles title → 1894 United States champion, partnering Robert Wrenn
|-
|||1977||–|||| || 1 Grand Slam doubles title → 2007 Australian Open champion, partnering Michaël Llodra
|-
|||1901||1987|||| 1976 || 5 Grand Slam doubles titles, all partnering Jacques Brugnon → 1927, 1930 and 1932 French champion • 1926 and 1928 Wimbledon champion – 5 Grand Slam mixed doubles titles → 1922, 1923, 1928 and 1929 French Champions, partnering Suzanne Lenglen for the first two and Eileen Bennett Whittingstall for the latter two • 1927 United States champion, partnering Bennett Whittingstall
|-
|||1965||–|||| ||1995 ATP Tour World Championships doubles champion, partnering Patrick Galbraith • ranked doubles world no. 1 for 17 weeks → 7 weeks in 1993 and 10 in 1994
|-
|||1952||–|||| 1998 ||  2 Grand Slam doubles titles → 1973 Wimbledon champion, partnering Ilie Năstase • 1975 U.S. Open champion, partnering Năstase
|-
|||1913||2004|| United States|| ||  1 Grand Slam doubles title → 1939 Wimbledon champion, partnering Bobby Riggs — 1 Grand Slam mixed doubles title → 1939 United States champion, partnering Sarah Palfrey Cooke
|-
|||1936||–|||| 1991 ||  4 Grand Slam doubles titles → 1957 and 1958 French champion, partnering Mal Anderson and Neale Fraser respectively • 1957 United States champion, partnering Fraser • 1958 Australian champion, partnering Fraser
|-
|||1909||1976||/ Germany|| 1977 ||  2 Grand Slam singles titles → 1934/1936 French champion, 1935 finalist • 1935/1936/1937 Wimbledon finalist • 1937 U.S. finalist
|-
|||1908||1991|| || 1979 ||  6 Grand slam doubles titles → 1929, 1930, 1932 and 1935 Australian champion, the first two partnering Harry Hopman, the third with Edgar Moon, and the fourth with Vivian McGrath • 1935 French champion, partnering Adrian Quist • 1935 Wimbledon champion, partnering Quist
|-
|||1944||–|||| ||  2 Grand Slam doubles titles → 1968 Australian champion, partnering Allan Stone • 1974 French Open, partnering Onny Parun – 1 Grand Slam mixed doubles title → 1968 Australian champion, partnering Billie Jean King
|-
|||1986||–|| Uruguay|| ||  1 Grand Slam doubles title → 2008 French Open champion, partnering Luis Horna • ranked world no. 21 in 2015
|-
|||1958||–|| South Africa/|| ||  1 Grand Slam doubles title → 1982 champion, partnering Steve Denton – 3 Grand Slam mixed doubles titles → 1981 and 1982 U.S. Open champion, both partnering Anne Smith • 1982 Wimbledon champion, partnering Smith
|- id=D
|||1928||2008|| Sweden|| 2007 ||  1 Grand Slam doubles title → 1958 Wimbledon champion, partnering Ulf Schmidt
|-
|||1879||1945|||| 1956 ||  3 Grand Slam doubles titles → 1899, 1900 and 1901 United States champion, partnering Holcombe Ward
|-
|||1962||–|||| ||  1 Grand Slam doubles title → 1991 Australian Open, partnering David Pate
|-
|||1882||1978|||| ||  1 Grand Slam doubles titles → 1911 Wimbledon doubles champion • 1906 Olympic gold medalist singles, doubles and mixed doubles • 1920 Olympic gold medalist mixed doubles
|-
|||1950||–|| Australia|| || 1 Grand Slam doubles title → 1975 Australian Open champion, partnering John Alexander – 1 Grand Slam mixed doubles title → 1976 US Open champion, partnering Billie Jean King
|-
|||1956||–|||| || 1 Grand Slam doubles title → 1982 US Open champion with Kevin Curren
|-
|||1917||2002|||| || 1 Grand Slam doubles title → 1938 French champion, partnering Yvon Petra
|-
|||1873||1939|| Great Britain|| ||  3 Grand Slam doubles titles → 1912 Australian champion, 1912 and 1913 Wimbledon champion • 1912 Olympic gold medalist mixed doubles
|-
|||1908||1978|||| 1962 || 2 doubles Grand Slam titles → 1929, 1930 United States champion, partnering George Lott 
|-
|||1875||1919|| Great Britain|| 1980 ||  10 Grand Slam doubles titles and 1 Olympic doubles gold medal → 1897, 1898, 1899, 1900, 1901, 1903, 1904 and 1905 Wimbledon champion, all partnering Reginald Doherty • 1902 and 1903 United States champion, both partnering Doherty • 1900 Olympic gold medalist, partnering Doherty
|-
|||1872||1910|| Great Britain|| 1980 ||  10 Grand Slam doubles titles and 1 Olympic doubles gold medal → 1897, 1898, 1899, 1900, 1901, 1903, 1904 and 1905 Wimbledon champion, all partnering Laurence Doherty • 1902 and 1903 United States champion, both partnering Doherty • 1900 Olympic gold medalist, partnering Doherty
|-
|||1974||–|| Australia|| ||  1 Grand Slam mixed doubles champion → 2005 Australian Open champion, partnering Samantha Stosur
|-
|||1921||2001||// Czechoslovakia/Egypt|| 1983 ||  1 Grand Slam doubles title → 1948 French champion, partnering Lennart Bergelin — 1 Grand Slam mixed doubles title → 1948 French champion, partnering Patricia Canning Todd
|-
|||1941||–|| South Africa|| 2013 ||  1 Grand Slam doubles title → 1972 U.S. Open champion, partnering Roger Taylor
|-
|||1852||1917|||| 1955 ||  5 Grand Slam doubles title → 1882–1884, 1886, 1887 U.S. Champion 
|- id=E
|||1966||–|| Sweden|| 2004 ||  3 Grand Slam doubles titles → 1987 and 1996 Australian Open champion, partnering Anders Järryd and Petr Korda respectively • 1987 U.S. Open champion, partnering Järryd •
|-
|||1954||–|| Australia|| ||  5 Grand Slam doubles titles → 1980, 1981, 1983 and 1984 Australian Open champion, partnering Kim Warwick for the first two, Paul McNamee, and Sherwood Stewart respectively • 1985 French Open champion, partnering Warwick
|-
|||1970||–|| Netherlands|| ||  6 Grand Slam doubles titles → 1994 and 1998 Australian Open champion, partnering Paul Haarhuis and Jonas Björkman respectively • 1994 U.S. Open champion, partnering Haarhuis • 1995 and 1998 French Open champion, both partnering Haarhuis • 1998 Wimbledon champion, partnering Haarhuis • ranked doubles world no. 1 for 18 weeks, in 1995
|-
|||1936||–|| Australia|| 1982 ||  16 Grand Slam doubles titles → 1959, 1961 and 1971 Wimbledon champion, partnering Neale Fraser for the first two and Rod Laver for the third • 1959, 1960, 1965 and 1966 United States champion, partnering Fraser for the first two and Fred Stolle for the latter two • 1960, 1961, 1962, 1963, 1964 and 1965 French champion, partnering Fraser for the first two, then Laver, then Manolo Santana, then Ken Fletcher, and then with Stolle for the final one • 1962, 1966 and 1969 Australian (Open) champion, partnering Fraser, Stolle, and Laver respectively
|-
|||1977||–|| Israel|| ||  1 Grand Slam doubles title → 2008 Australian Open champion, partnering Andy Ram
|- id=F
|||1926||2022|||| 1974 ||  2 Grand Slam doubles titles → 1944 United States doubles champion, partnering Don McNeill • 1947 Wimbledon doubles champion, partnering Jack Kramer
|-
|||1981||–|||| ||  1 Olympic doubles gold medal → 2008 Beijing Olympics doubles gold medalist, partnering Stan Wawrinka
|-
|||1952||–|||| ||  1 Grand Slam doubles title → 1978 Australian Open champion, partnering Kim Warwick
|-
|||1960||–|| Australia|| || 7 Grand Slam doubles titles → 1982 Australian Open champion, partnering John Alexander • 1984 and 1991 U.S. Open champion, partnering Tomáš Šmíd and Anders Järryd respectively • 1986 and 1991 French Open champion, partnering Šmíd and Järryd respectively • 1989 and 1991 Wimbledon champion, both partnering Järryd • ranked doubles world no. 1 for 40 weeks → 27 weeks in 1991 and 13 in 1992
|-
|||1963||–|||| ||  4 Grand Slam doubles titles → 1985 and 1993 US Open champion • 1987 and 1988 Wimbledon champion • ranked world no. 1 for 5 weeks → 2 weeks in 1985 and 3 in 1986
|-
|||1955||–|||| || 7 Grand Slam doubles titles, all partnering John McEnroe → 1979, 1981, 1983 and 1984 Wimbledon champion, • 1979, 1981 and 1983 U.S. Open champion • ranked world no. 1 for 17 weeks → 3 weeks in 1982 and 14 in 1984
|-
|||1987||–|||| ||  1 Grand Slam doubles title → 2015 Australian Open champion, partnering Simone Bolelli • 2011 French Open singles quarterfinalist • ranked world no. 13 in 2014
|-
|||1934||–|| South Africa|| || 1 Grand Slam mixed doubles title → 1955 United States champion, partnering Darlene Hard
|-
|||1965||–|||| ||1991 and 1993 Australian Open quarterfinalist • 1991, 1992 and 1994 Wimbledon quarterfinalist
|-
|||1933||–|| Australia|| 1984 ||  11 Grand Slam doubles titles → 1957, 1958 and 1962 Australian champion, partnering Lew Hoad, Ashley Cooper and Roy Emerson respectively • 1957, 1959 and 1960 United States champion, partnering Cooper and then Emerson twice • 1958, 1960 and 1962 French champion, partnering Cooper and then Emerson twice • 1959 and 1961 Wimbledon champion, both partnering Emerson – 5 mixed doubles Grand Slam titles → 1956 Australian champion, partnering Beryl Penrose Collier • 1958, 1959 and 1960 United States champion, all partnering Margaret Osborne duPont • 1962 Wimbledon champion, partnering Osborne duPont
|-
|||1884||1962|| Germany||  ||1914 Wimbledon finalist • 1908 Olympic silver medalist 
|- id=G
|||1967||–|||| ||1995 ATP Tour World champion, partnering Grant Connell• ranked doubles world no. 1 for 4 weeks → 3 weeks in 1993 and 1 in 1994 – 2 grand slam mixed doubles titles → 1994 and 1996 U.S. Open champion, partnering Elna Reinach and Lisa Raymond respectively
|-
|||1898||1971|| United States|| ||  1 Grand Slam doubles title → 1920 Wimbledon champion, partnering Richard Norris Williams 
|-
|||1986||–|||| ||  1 Grand Slam mixed doubles title → 2004 French Open champion, partnering Tatiana Golovin
|-
|||1954||1994|||| ||  1 Grand Slam doubles title → 1975 Wimbledon champion, partnering Gene Mayer
|-
|||1938||–|| Spain|| 2009 || 1 Grand Slam singles titles → 1972 French champion  • ranked world no. 10 amateur in 1969 
|-
|||1942||–||/ Spain|| ||1968 Australian Championships finalist – 1975 Masters Grand Prix champion, partnering Manuel Orantes
|-
|||1890||1951|||| ||  1 Grand Slam doubles titles → 1911 Wimbledon doubles champion • 1912 Olympic gold medalist singles, doubles
|-
|||1960||–|| Ecuador|| ||  1 Grand Slam singles title → 1990 French Open champion, 1984, 1986 and 1987 quarterfinalist • 1984 Wimbledon quarterfinalist • 1984 U.S. Open quarterfinalist • ranked world no. 4 in 1990
|-
|||1928||1995|||| 1968 ||  2 Grand Slam singles titles → 1948 and 1949 United States champion • 1968 French Open semifinalist • 1968 U.S. Open quarterfinalist • rated world no. 1 for 8 years, 1952, 1954, 1955, 1956, 1957, 1958, 1959 and (as co-no.1) 1960
|-
|||1980||–|| Chile|| ||  1 Olympic doubles gold medal → 2004 gold medalist, partnering Nicolás Massú
|-
|||1868||1928|| Great Britain|| 2006 ||  1 Grand Slam doubles titles → 1909 •  1908 Olympic singles gold medallist • 1908 Olympic doubles gold medallist
|-
|||1850||1906|| Great Britain|| ||  1 Grand Slam singles title → 1877 Wimbledon champion, 1878 finalist
|-
|||1952||–|||| ||  3 Grand Slam doubles titles → 1975 and 1977 French Open champion, both partnering Raúl Ramírez • 1976 Wimbledon champion, partnering Ramírez
|-
|||1964||–|||| ||Ranked world no. 25 in 1985 – ranked doubles world no. 1 for 13 weeks → 1 week in 1989 and 6 in 1992, and 6 in 1993
|-
|||1943||–|||| ||  1 doubles Grand Slam title → 1966 French champion, partnering Dennis Ralston
|-
|||1951||–|||| || 1 Grand Slam mixed doubles title → 1984 U.S. Open champion, partnering Manuela Maleeva
|-
|||1959||–|| Switzerland|| ||1985 Wimbledon quarterfinalist • 1985 U.S. Open quarterfinalist • ranked world no. 22 in 1986
|- id=H
|||1966||–|| Netherlands|| ||  6 Grand Slam doubles titles → 1994 Australian Open champion, partnering Jacco Eltingh • 1994 U.S. Open champion, partnering Eltingh • 1995, 1998 and 2002 French Open champion, partnering Eltingh twice and then Yevgeny Kafelnikov • 1998 Wimbledon champion, partnering Eltingh • 1993 and 1998 ATP Tour World Championships titlist, both partnering Eltingh • ranked doubles world no. 1 for 70 weeks → 27 weeks in 1994, 27 weeks in 1995 and 16 weeks in 1999
|-
|||1878||1937|| United States|| 1961 ||1906 United States quarterfinalist – 4 Grand Slam doubles titles → 1907, 1908, 1909 and 1910 United States champion, partnering Fred Alexander
|-
|||1867||1934|| United States|| ||1891 U.S. Championships singles semifinalist • 2 Grand Slam doubles titles → 1888, 1890 U.S. champion, partnering Oliver Campbell and Clarence Hobart
|-
|||1864||1943|| Ireland|| ||  1 Grand Slam singles title → 1890 Wimbledon champion, 1889 semifinalist • rated co-world no. 1 for 2 years, 1889 and 1890
|-
|||1849||1935|| Great Britain|| ||  2 Grand Slam singles title → 1879 and 1880 Wimbledon champion, 1881 runner-up • rated world no. 1 for 2 years, 1879 and 1880
|-
|||1899||1990|| Australia|| ||  3 Grand Slam doubles titles → 1922, 1926, 1927 Australasian champion, partnering Gerald Patterson  •  5 Grand Slam doubles titles → 1922, 1926, 1927 Australasian champion, partnering Esna Boyd, 1923, 1928 U.S. champion, partnering Helen Wills
|-
|||1915||1943||/ Germany|| || 2 Grand Slam doubles titles → 1937 French champions, 1937 U.S. champion, partnering Gottfried von Cramm
|-
|||1900||1981|||| || 1 Grand Slam doubles title → 1928 U.S. champion, partnering George Lott
|-
|||1991||–|||| ||  1 Grand Slam doubles title → 2015 US Open doubles champion, partnering Nicolas Mahut
|-
|||1940||–|| Australia/ South Africa|| || 9 Grand Slam doubles titles → 1962, 1964, 1967, 1972 and 1978 Wimbledon champion, partnering for the first two Fred Stolle and for the final three Frew McMillan • 1963 and 1964 Australian champion, partnering Stolle • 1972 French Open champion, partnering McMillan • 1977 U.S. Open champion, partnering McMillan • 1977 Masters Grand Prix champion, partnering McMillan • ranked doubles world no. 1 for 6 weeks, in 1976 – 6 Grand Slam mixed doubles titles → 1961 Australian champion, partnering Jan Lehane • 1970 and 1979 French Open champion, partnering Billie Jean King and Wendy Turnbull respectively • 1977 and 1979 Wimbledon champion, both partnering Greer Stevens • 1979 U.S. Open champion, partnering Stevens
|-
|||1981||–|| Australia|| ||  1 Grand Slam doubles title → 2000 U.S. Open champion, partnering Max Mirnyi
|-
|||1964||–|| Switzerland|| || 1 Grand Slam doubles title → 1992 French Open champion, partnering Marc Rosset
|-
|||1934||1994|| Australia|| 1980 ||  8 Grand Slam doubles titles → 1953, 1956 and 1957 Wimbledon champion, partnering Ken Rosewall, Rex Hartwig, and Rosewall respectively • 1953 and 1956 Australian champion, partnering Rosewell for the first two and then Neale Fraser • 1953 French champion, partnering Rosewell • 1956 United States champion, partnering Rosewell – 1 Grand Slam mixed doubles title → 1954 French champion, partnering Maureen Connolly
|-
|||1870||1930|||| ||1891, 1905 U.S. Championships singles finalist • 1898 Wimbledon singles semifinalist • 3 Grand Slam doubles titles → 1890, 1893, 1894 U.S. champion, partnering Valentine Hall and Fred Hovey • 3 Grand Slam mixed doubles titles → 1892, 1893, 1905 U.S. champion
|-
|||1938||–|||| ||1959 U.S. Championships singles semifinalist • 1961 French Championships singles quarterfinalist • ranked world no. 7 in 1960
|-
|||1906||1985|| || 1978 ||  2 Grand slam doubles titles → 1929, 1930 Australian champion, partnering Jack Crawford – 5 Grand Slam mixed doubles title → 1930, 1936, 1937 and 1938 Australian champion, partnering Nell Hall Hopman – United States champion, partnering Alice Marble. 
|-
|||1980||–|| Peru|| ||Ranked world no. 16 in 2008 – 1 Grand Slam doubles title → 2008 French Open champion, partnering Pablo Cuevas
|-
|||1868||1945|||| 1974 ||1895 United States champion, 1896 finalist (results likely incomplete as drawsheets for other years unavailable)
|-
|||1902||1997|| Great Britain|| ||  3 Grand Slam doubles titles → 1933 French champion and 1934 Australian champion, partnering Fred Perry and 1936 Wimbledon champion, partnering Raymond Tuckey.
|-
|||1894||1981|||| 1961 ||1923 Wimbledon finalist • 1928 and 1929 United States finalist
|-
|||1975||–|| Australia|| ||  1 Grand Slam doubles title → 2005 Wimbledon champion, partnering Wesley Moodie
|- id=I
|||1985||–|||| ||2011 U.S. Open quarterfinalist • ranked world no. 9 in 2012
|- id=J
|||1961||–|| Sweden|| ||  8 Grand Slam doubles titles → 1983, 1987 and 1991 French Open champion, partnering Hans Simonsson, Robert Seguso and John Fitzgerald respectively • 1987 and 1991 U.S. Open champion, partnering Stefan Edberg and Fitzgerald respectively • 1989 and 1991 Wimbledon champion, both partnering Fitzgerald • 1987 Australian Open champion, partnering Edberg • 1985 and 1986 Masters Grand Prix champion, both partnering Edberg; 1991 ATP Tour World Championships titlist, partnering Fitzgerald • ranked doubles world no. 1 for 107 weeks → 6 weeks in 1985, 5 in 1986, 45 in 1988, 31 in 1989, 4 in 1990 and 16 in 1992
|-
|||1968||–|||| ||  1 Grand Slam doubles title → 2001 Wimbledon champion, partnering Jared Palmer
|-
|||1894||1946|||| 1958 ||  3 Grand Slam doubles titles → 1915, 1916 and 1920 United States champion, partnering Clarence Griffin – 1 Grand Slam mixed doubles title → 1921 United States champion, partnering Mary Browne
|-
|||1964||–|||| ||Ranked doubles world no. 1 for 1 week, in 1992
|- id=K
|||1974||–|| Russia|| ||  4 Grand Slam doubles titles → 1996, 1997 and 2002 French Open champion, partnering Daniel Vacek for the first two and Paul Haarhuis for the third • 1997 U.S. Open champion, partnering Vacek
|-
|||1899||1966|||| || 2 Grand Slam doubles titles → 1924 French champion, 1926 US champion • 1926 Wimbledon mixed doubles finalist
|-
|||1935||–|| Great Britain|| || 1 Grand Slam mixed doubles title → 1959 French champion, partnering Yola Ramírez
|-
|||1974||–|| Austria|| ||  1 Grand Slam doubles title → 2007 U.S. Open champion, partnering Simon Aspelin
|-
|||1971||–|| Bahamas|| ||  3 Grand Slam doubles titles → 2002 Australian Open champion, partnering Daniel Nestor • 2004 U.S. Open champion, partnering Nestor • 2007 French Open champion, partnering Nestor • 2007 Tennis Masters Cup champion, partnering Nestor • ranked doubles world no. 1 for 65 weeks → 16 weeks in 2002, 23 in 2003, 13 in 2004 and 13 in 2005 — 1 Grand Slam mixed doubles title → 2009 Wimbledon champion, partnering Anna-Lena Grönefeld
|-
|||1945||–|| Brazil|| || 1 Grand Slam mixed doubles title → 1975 French Open champion, partnering Fiorella Bonicelli
|-
|||1946||–|| Czechoslovakia|| 1990 ||  3 Grand Slam singles titles → 1970 and 1971 French Open champion, 1972 and 1973 quarterfinalist • 1973 Wimbledon champion, 1972 semifinalist, 1974 quarterfinalist • 1971 and 1973 U.S. Open finalist, 1976 quarterfinalist
|-
|||1968||–|| Czechoslovakia /  Czech Republic|| ||  1 Grand Slam singles title → 1998 Australian Open champion, 1993 quarterfinalist • 1992 French Open finalist • 1998 Wimbledon quarterfinalist • 1995 and 1997 U.S. Open quarterfinalist • ranked world no. 2 in 1998
|-
|||1921||2009|||| 1968 ||  6 Grand Slam doubles titles → 1940, 1941, 1943, 1947 United States champion, all partnering Ted Schroeder • 1946 and 1947 Wimbledon champion, both partnering Schroeder — 1 Grand Slam mixed doubles title → 1941 United States champion, partnering Sarah Palfrey Cooke
|-
|||1887||1968|| Germany||  ||1913 Wimbledon semifinalist • 1912 Olympic singles bronze medalist 
|-
|||1967||–|||| ||1989 U.S. Open semifinalist, 1988 and 1990 quarterfinalist • 1995 Australian Open semifinalist • ranked world no. 6 in 1990
|-
|||1958||–|| South Africa/|| ||  2 Grand Slam singles titles → 1981 and 1982 Australian Open champion, 1984 semifinalist, 1983 and 1985 quarterfinalist • 1986 French Open semifinalist • 1981 and 1982 Wimbledon quarterfinalist • 1980 U.S. Open semifinalist, 1978 and 1979 quarterfinalist • ranked world no. 7 in 1984
|-
|||1937||–|| India|| ||1960 and 1961 Wimbledon semifinalist • 1962 French quarterfinalist
|-
|||1961||–|| India|| ||1981 and 1987 U.S. Open quarterfinalist • 1986 Wimbledon quarterfinalist • ranked world no. 23 in 1985
|-
|||1982||–|| Poland|| ||  1 Grand Slam doubles title → 2014 Australian Open doubles champion, partnering Robert Lindstedt • 2013 Wimbledon singles quarterfinalist
|-
|||1976||–|| Brazil|| 2012 ||  3 Grand Slam singles titles → 1997, 2000 and 2001 French Open champion • 1999 Wimbledon quarterfinalist • 1999 and 2001 U.S. Open quarterfinalist • 2000 Tennis Masters Cup champion • ranked world no. 1 for 43 weeks → 4 weeks in 2000 and 39 in 2001
|- id=L
|||1904||1996|||| 1976 ||  7 Grand Slam singles titles → 1925, 1927 and 1929 French champion, 1926 and 1928 finalist • 1925 and 1928 Wimbledon champion, 1924 finalist, 1927 semifinalist • 1926 and 1927 United States champion • rated world no. 1 for 2 years — 3 Grand Slam doubles titles → 1925 and 1929 French champion, both partnering Jean Borotra • 1925 Wimbledon champion, partnering Borotra
|-
|||1976||–|| Ecuador|| ||1999 Australian Open semifinalist • 2002 Wimbledon quarterfinalist • ranked world no. 6 in 1999
|-
|||1973||–|||| ||  1 Grand Slam doubles title and 1 Olympic doubles gold medal → 1999 U.S. Open doubles champion, partnering Alex O’Brien • 2000 Olympic doubles gold medalist, partnering Daniel Nestor • 1999 Tennis Masters Cup champion, partnering O’Brien
|-
|||1872||1926|| United States|| 1956 ||  7 Grand Slam singles titles → 1901, 1902, 1907, 1908, 1909, 1910 and 1911 United States champion, 1900 and 1903 finalist • rated world no. 1 for 5 years → 1901 and 1902 (co-rated), 1908, 1909 and 1910
|-
|||1938||–|| Australia|| 1981 || 6 Grand Slam doubles titles → 1959, 1960 and 1961 Australian champion, partnering Bob Mark; 1969 Australian Open champion, partnering Roy Emerson • 1961 French champion, partnering Emerson • 1971 Wimbledon champion, partnering Emerson – 3 mixed doubles Grand Slam titles → 1959 and 1960 Wimbledon champion, partnering Darlene Hard • 1961 French champion, partnering Hard
|-
|||1851||1925|| Great Britain|| 2006 ||  1 Grand Slam singles title → 1887 Wimbledon champion, 1880, 1884, 1885, 1886 and 1888 finalist, 1878, 1881 and 1882 and All-Comers semifinalist
|-
|||1964||–|||| ||  5 Grand Slam doubles titles → 1988, 1989 and 2000 Australian Open champion, partnering Jim Pugh for the first two and Ellis Ferreira for the last one • 1990 Wimbledon champion, partnering Pugh • 1993 U.S. Open champion, partnering Ken Flach • 1988 Masters Grand Prix champion, partnering Pugh; 1997 ATP Tour World Championships titlist, partnering Jonathan Stark; 2001 ATP World Doubles Challenge Cup champion, partnering Ferreira • ranked doubles world no. 1 for 9 weeks, in 1990 – 4 mixed doubles titles → 1995 and 1997 Australian Open champion, Natasha Zvereva and Manon Bollegraf respectively • 1990 Wimbledon champion, partnering Zina Garrison • 1997 U.S. Open champion, partnering Bollegraf
|-
|||1963||–|||| || 1 Grand Slam doubles title → 1984 French Open champion, partnering Yannick Noah
|-
|||1960||–|| Czechoslovakia/|| 2001 ||  8 Grand Slam singles titles → 1984, 1986 and 1987 French Open champion, 1981 and 1985 finalist, 1983 and 1988 quarterfinalist • 1985, 1986 and 1987 U.S. Open champion, 1982, 1983 and 1984 finalist, 1991 semifinalist, 1980, 1990 and 1992 quarterfinalist • 1989 and 1990 Australian Open champion, 1983 and 1991 finalist, 1985, 1987 and 1988 semifinalist, 1992 quarterfinalist • 1986 and 1987 Wimbledon finalist, 1983, 1984, 1988, 1989 and 1990 semifinalist • 1981, 1982, 1985, 1986 and 1987 Masters Grand Prix champion • ranked world no. 1 for 270 weeks → 17 weeks in 1983, 15 in 1984, 17 in 1985, 52 in 1986, 52 in 1987, 37 in 1988, 48 in 1989 and 32 in 1990
|-
|||1867||1930|| Great Britain|| || 1886, 1888, 1892, 1894 Wimbledon finalist
|-
|||1977||–|| Sweden|| ||  1 Grand Slam doubles title → 2014 Australian Open doubles champion, partnering Łukasz Kubot
|-
|||1980||–|||| ||  3 Grand Slam doubles titles → 2003 and 2004 Australian Open champion, both partnering Fabrice Santoro • 2007 Wimbledon champion, partnering Arnaud Clément
|-
|||1954||–|| Great Britain|| || 3 mixed doubles Grand Slam titles → 1983 and 1984 Wimbledon champion, partnering Wendy Turnbull • 1982 French Open champion, partnering Turnbull
|-
|||1906||1991|||| 1964 || 8 doubles Grand Slam titles → 1928, 1929, 1930, 1933 and 1934 United States champion, partnering John Hennessey, John Doeg, Doeg again, Lester Stoefen and Stoefen again, respectively • 1931 and 1934 Wimbledon champion, partnering John Van Ryn and Stoefen respectively • 1931 French champion, partnering Van Ryn – 4 mixed doubles Grand Slam titles → 1929, 1931 and 1934 United States champion, partnering Betty Nuthall, Nuthall again, and Helen Jacobs, respectively • 1931 Wimbledon champion, partnering Anna McCune Harper
|-
|||1937||–|| Sweden|| ||1961, 1964 French Championships singles semifinalist • ranked world no. 3 in 1964
|-
|||1949||–|||| ||  5 doubles Grand Slam titles → 1968, 1974, 1978 and 1980 U.S. Open champion, all partnering Stan Smith • 1970 Australian Open champion, partnering Smith
|-
|||1886||1935|| Great Britain|| ||  5 Grand Slam doubles titles → 1905, 1911 Australian champion, 1921, 1922, 1923 Wimbledon champion • 3 Grand Slam mixed doubles titles → 1919, 1921, 1923 Wimbledon champion
|-
|||1906||1963|| Great Britain|| ||1930, 1932 French Championships quarterfinalist
|- id=M
|||1935||–|||| ||1959 Wimbledon semifinalist, 1958 and 1960 quarterfinalist • 1959 Australian semifinalist • 1959 United States quarterfinalist
|-
|||1867||1905|| Great Britain|| ||  1 Grand Slam singles title → 1896 Wimbledon champion • 1900 Olympics singles and doubles silver medalist
|-
|||1982||–|||| ||  1 Grand Slam doubles title → 2015 US Open doubles champion, partnering Pierre-Hugues Herbert
|-
|||1916||–|| United States|| 1973 ||  4 Grand Slam doubles titles → 1936 and 1938 United States champion, both partnering Don Budge • 1937 and 1938 Wimbledon champion, partnering Budge – 1 Grand Slam mixed doubles title → 1936 U.S. mixed doubles champion, partnering Alice Marble
|-
|||1980||–|| Belgium|| || 1 Grand Slam doubles title → 2004 French Open champion, partnering Olivier Rochus
|-
|||1956||–|||| || 1 Grand Slam mixed doubles title → 1980 U.S. Open champion, partnering Anne Smith
|-
| ||1979||–|| Chile|| || 1 Olympic doubles gold medal → 2004 gold medalist, partnering Fernando González
|-
|||1950||–|| Australia|| ||1974 Australian Open quarterfinalist
|-
|||1883||1941|| Great Britain|| ||1909, 1914, 1920 Wimbledon singles semifinalist • 1914 Wimbledon doubles finalist
|-
|||1956||–|||| ||  2 Grand Slam doubles titles → 1978 and 1979 French Open champion, partnering Hank Pfister and Sandy Mayer respectively
|-
|||1952||–|||| ||  2 Grand Slam doubles titles → 1975 Wimbledon champion, partnering Vitas Gerulaitis • 1979 French Open champion, partnering Gene Mayer
|-
|||1959||–|||| 1999 ||  9 Grand Slam doubles titles → 1979, 1981, 1983, 1984 and 1992 Wimbledon champion, the first four partnering Peter Fleming and the fifth partnering Michael Stich • 1979, 1981, 1983 and 1989 U.S. Open champion, the first three partnering Fleming and the fourth partnering Mark Woodforde • 1978, 1979, 1980, 1981, 1982, 1983 and 1984 Masters Grand Prix doubles champion, all partnering Fleming • ranked world no. 1 for 267 weeks – 1 mixed Grand Slam doubles title → 1977 French Open champion, partnering Mary Carillo
|-
|||1966||–|||| ||1991 Australian Open semifinalist • 1995 U.S. Open quarterfinalist — 1 Grand Slam doubles titles → 1989 French Open champion, partnering Jim Grabb
|-
|||1916||1978|| Australia|| ||  1 Grand Slam title → 1927 Australian champion • 1 Grand Slam doubles title → 1935 Australian champion, partnering John Bromwich • 1933, 1934, 1935 French Championship doubles finalist
|-
|||1929||–|| Australia|| 1999 ||  1 Grand Slam title → 1952 Australian champion, 1950 and 1951 finalist • 1951 Wimbledon finalist, 1952 quarterfinalist – 7 Grand Slam doubles titles, all partnering Frank Sedgman → 1951 and 1952 French champion • 1951 and 1952 Wimbledon champion • 1951 and 1952 Australian champion • 1951 United States champion – 1 Grand Slam mixed doubles champion → 1950 United States champion, partnering Margaret Osborne duPont
|-
|||1941||1986|||| 1986 ||  1 Grand Slam doubles title → 1963 Wimbledon champion, 1961 finalist, 1964 semifinalist • 1962, 1963 and 1964 United States semifinalist, 1960 quarterfinalist – 3 Grand Slam doubles titles → 1961, 1963 and 1964 United States champion, all partnering Dennis Ralston
|-
|||1890||1957|| United States|| 1957 || 3 Grand Slam doubles titles → 1912, 1913 and 1914 United States champion, all partnering Tom Bundy
|-
|||1955||2019|| Australia|| || 3 Grand Slam doubles titles → 1980, 1982 Wimbledon champion, partnering Paul McNamee • 1979 Australian Open champion, partnering McNamee
|-
|||1954||–|| Australia|| || 4 Grand Slam doubles titles → 1980, 1982 Wimbledon champion, partnering Peter McNamara • 1979, 1983 Australian Open champion, partnering McNamara and Mark Edmondson respectively
|-
|||1918||1996|||| 1965 ||  2 Grand Slam singles titles → 1939 French champion, 1940 United States champion • 2 Grand Slam doubles titles → 1939 French champion, 1944 United States champion
|-
|||1942||–|| South Africa|| 1992 || 5 Grand Slam doubles titles  – 5 Grand Slam mixed doubles titles
|-
|||1964||–|| Czechoslovakia|| ||1988 Olympic gold medalist • 1986 US Open finalist, 1987 quarterfinalist • 1989 Australian Open finalist, 1987 quarterfinalist • 1987 French Open semifinalist • 1988 Wimbledon semifinalist, 1986 quarterfinalist
|-
|||1848||1928|| Great Britain||  ||1889 U.S. Championships singles semifinalist • 1895 Wimbledon singles semifinalist • 1888 Wimbledon doubles all-comers finalist, partnering A.G. Ziffo
|-
|||1949||–|| West Germany|| ||Ranked world no. 20 in 1973
|-
|||1981||–|| Austria|| ||2010 French Open semifinalist • 1 Grand Slam doubles title → 2010 Wimbledon champion (with Philipp Petzschner) • ranked world no. 9 in 2011
|-
|||1907||1987|| Czechoslovakia||  ||1938 French Championships singles finalist • 1935 U.S. Championships mixed doubles finalist, partnering Kay Stammers
|-
|||1944||–|| Soviet Union|| ||1973 Wimbledon finalist, 1972/1974 quarterfinalist • 1972 French Open semifinalist • 1972 Australian Open semifinalist, 1973/1975 quarterfinalist • 1974 US Open quarterfinalist
|-
|||1977||–|| Belarus|| || 4 Grand Slam doubles titles → 2000/2002 US Open champion (the first with L. Hewitt, and the second with Bhupathi) • 2005/2006 French Open champion (both with Björkman) — 3 Grand Slam mixed doubles titles → 1998 Wimbledon champion (with Serena Williams) • 1998/2007 US Open (the first with Serena Williams, and the second with Azarenka)
|-
|||1917||1986|| Yugoslavia||  || 1 Grand Slam mixed doubles titles → 1938 French champion, partnering Simonne Mathieu
|-
|||1979||–|| South Africa|| ||  1 Grand Slam doubles title → 2005 Wimbledon champion (with Huss) • 2009 French Open doubles finalist (with Dick Norman)
|-
|||1904||1976|| Australia|| || 1 Grand Slam doubles titles → 1932 Australian champion with Jack Crawford — 2 Grand Slam mixed doubles title → 1929, 1934 Australian champion
|-
|||1920||2006|| Argentina|| || 1 Grand Slam mixed doubles title → 1950 French champion
|-
|||1976||–|||| ||  1 Grand Slam title → 1998 French Open champion, 2003/2004/2007 quarterfinalist • 1997 Australian Open finalist, 2001 quarterfinalist • 1998 US Open semifinalist, 2007 quarterfinalist • 2002 Masters semifinalist • ranked world no. 1 for 2 weeks
|-
|||1913||–|| United States|| 1972 || 4 Grand Slam doubles titles → 1942/1945/1946/1948 U.S. champion, partnering Bill Talbert
|-
|||1983||–|| Great Britain|| ||  1 Grand Slam mixed doubles title → 2007 Wimbledon champion, partnering Jelena Janković
|- id=N
|||1946||–|| Romania|| 1991 ||  2 Grand Slam singles titles → 1972 US Open champion, 1976 semifinalist, 1975 quarterfinalist • 1973 French Open champion, 1971 finalist, 1970/1974/1977 quarterfinalist • 1972/1976 Wimbledon finalist, 1977/1978 quarterfinalist • 1971/1972/1973/1975 Masters champion, 1974 finalist • ranked world no. 1 for 40 weeks and for 1973
|-
|||1873||1949|| United States|| || 1 Grand Slam doubles titles → 1896 U.S. champion, partnering Sam Neel
|-
|||1972||–|||| ||  5 Grand Slam doubles titles → 2002 Australian Open champion, partnering Mark Knowles • 2004 US Open champion, partnering Knowles • 2007 French Open champion, partnering Knowles • 2008/2009 Wimbledon champion, both partnering Nenad Zimonjić • 2000 Olympic gold medal, partnering Sébastien Lareau • 2007/2008 Masters champion, the first partnering Knowles, the second with Zimonjić • ranked world no. 1 in 2002/2009
|-
|||1944||–|| Australia|| 1986 ||  7 Grand Slam singles titles → 1967/1970/1971 Wimbledon champion, 1969 finalist, 1974 quarterfinalist • 1967/1973 US Open champion, 1969/1970/1974 semifinalist, 1968 quarterfinalist • 1973/1975 Australian Open champion, 1976 finalist, 1969/1970/1972/1974/1977[Dec] quarterfinalist • 1969 French Open quarterfinalist • ranked world no. 1
|-
|||1930||–|| Denmark|| ||1 Grand Slam mixed doubles title → 1957 U.S. champion, partnering Althea Gibson
|-
|||1886||1932|| United States|| ||  1 Grand Slam mixed doubles title → 1908 United States champion mixed doubles, partnering Edith Rotch
|-
|||1960||–|||| 2005 ||  1 Grand Slam doubles titles → 1984 French Open champion, partnering Henri Leconte
|-
|||1899||1956|| South Africa||  || 1 Grand Slam doubles title → 1923 U.S. champion
|-
|||1963||–|| Sweden|| ||  1 Grand Slam doubles titles → 1986 Wimbledon champion, partnering Mats Wilander
|- id=O
|||1970||–||||  || 1 Grand Slam doubles titles → 1999 US Open champion, partnering Sébastien Lareau
|-
|||1944||–|| Netherlands|| || 2 Grand Slam doubles titles → 1973 French Open Wimbledon champion with John Newcombe • 1976 US Open champion with Marty Riessen
|-
|||1936||–|||| 1987 || 1 Grand Slam doubles title → 1958 U.S. champion, partnering Ham Richardson
|-
|||1949||–||/|| 2012 ||  1 Grand Slam singles title → 1975 US Open champion, 1976/1977 quarterfinalist • 1974 French Open finalist, 1972 semifinalist, 1976/1978 quarterfinalist • 1972 Wimbledon semifinalist • 1968 Australian Open quarterfinalist • 1976 Masters champion
|-
|||1938||1969|| Mexico|| 1979 || 3 Grand Slam doubles titles → 1960/1963 Wimbledon champion • 1962 US Open champion, ranked world no. 1 in 1963
|- id=P
|||1973||–|| India|| || 6 Grand Slam doubles titles → 1999/2001 French Open champion, both partnering Mahesh Bhupathi • 1999 Wimbledon champion, partnering Bhupathi • 2006 US Open champion, partnering Martin Damm • 2009 French open, US Open champion both partnering Mark Knowles • ranked world no. 1 in doubles for 33 weeks — 6 Grand Slam mixed doubles titles → 1999/2003 Wimbledon champion, partnering Lisa Raymond and Martina Navratilova respectively • 2003 Australian Open champion, partnering Navratilova • 2010 Australian Open, Wimbledon Champion
|-
|||1912||1994|| Yugoslavia|| ||1938 French Championships singles semifinalist
|-
|||1936||–|| Mexico|| ||  2 Grand Slam doubles titles → 1962 U.S. National champion • 1963 Wimbledon champion
|-
|||1971||–|||| ||  2 Grand Slam doubles titles → 1995 Australian Open champion, partnering Richey Reneberg • 2001 Wimbledon champion, partnering Donald Johnson • ranked world no. 1 in doubles for 16 weeks
|-
|||1950||–|| Italy|| ||  1 Grand Slam singles title → 1976 French Open champion, 1973/1975 semifinalist, 1972/1977 quarterfinalist • 1979 Wimbledon quarterfinalist • 1976 Davis Cup champion • ranked world no. 4 in 1976
|-
|||1870||1952|||| ||1899 U.S. Championships singles finalist
|-
|||1881||1946|| Great Britain|| ||  1 Grand Slam doubles title → 1912 Australian champion
|-
|||1916||1997|| United States|| 1966 || 3 Grand Slam doubles titles → 1943 U.S. champion, 1949 French champion, 1949 Wimbledon champion
|-
|||1947||–|||| ||1973 Australian Open finalist • 1975 French Open quarterfinalist • 1971/1972 Wimbledon quarterfinalist • 1973 US Open quarterfinalist
|-
|||1962||–|||| ||Ranked world no. 18 in 1987
|-
|||1895||1967|| Australia|| 1989 ||Rated co-world no. 1 in 1919 with "Little Bill" Johnston
|-
|||1924||–|||| 1977 || 1 Grand Slam doubles titles → 1957 Wimbledon champion — 1 Grand Slam mixed doubles title → 1946 French champion
|-
|||1909||1995|| Great Britain|| 1975 ||  8 Grand Slam singles titles, including a Career Slam → 1933/1934/1936 U.S. champion • 1934/1935/1936 Wimbledon champion • 1934 Australian champion, 1935 finalist • 1935 French champion, 1936 finalist • rated world no. 1 for 5 years
|-
|||1916||–|||| ||  1 Grand Slam singles title → 1946 Wimbledon champion, 1947 quarterfinalist
|-
|||1953||–|||| || 2 Grand Slam doubles title → 1978, 1980 French Open champion, partnering Gene Mayer and Victor Amaya respectively
|-
|||1933||–|| Italy|| 1986 ||  2 Grand Slam singles titles → 1959 and 1960 French Open champion, 1961 and 1964 finalist, 1960 Wimbledon semifinalist • ranked world no. 3 in 1959
|-
|||1939||–|| Yugoslavia|| ||1973 French Open singles finalist • 1970 US Open doubles champion
|-
|||1869||1942|| Ireland|| ||  2 Grand Slam singles titles → 1893, 1894 Wimbledon champion
|-
|||1990||-|||| ||  1 Grand Slam doubles title → 2014 Wimbledon doubles champion, partnering Jack Sock • 2015 Wimbledon singles quarterfinalist • ranked world no. 25 in 2014
|-
|||1964||–|||| ||
|-
|||1913||1985|| Yugoslavia|| ||1938, 1939 French Championships singles quarterfinalist, 1946 Wimbledon singles quarterfinalist,
|- id=Q
|||1913||1991|| Australia|| 1984 ||  10 Grand Slam doubles titles → 1936/1937/1938/1939/1940/1946/1947/1948/1949/1950 Australian champion, the first two partnering Don Turnbull, the last eight with John Bromwich
|- id=R
|||1972||–|| Australia|| 2006 ||  2 Grand Slam singles titles → 1997/1998 U.S. Open champion • 2000/2001 Wimbledon finalist, 1999 semifinalist • 1997 French Open semifinalist • 2001 Australian Open semifinalist • ranked world no. 1 for 1 week
|-
|||1942||–|||| 1987 ||1966 Wimbledon finalist
|-
|||1980||–|| Israel|| ||  1 Grand Slam doubles title → 2008 Australian Open champion, partnering Jonathan Erlich — 2 Grand Slam mixed doubles titles → 2006 Wimbledon champion, partnering Vera Zvonareva, 2007 French Open champion, partnering Nathalie Dechy
|-
|||1953||–|| Mexico|| ||Ranked world no. 4 in 1976 – 3 Grand Slam doubles titles → 1975/1977 French Open champion • 1976 Wimbledon champion • 1980 Masters champion
|-
|||1895||1962|| South Africa||  ||1924 Wimbledon singles semifinalist • 1927 French Championships quarterfinalist  • 1920 Olympic singles gold medalist
|-
|||1965||–|||| ||Ranked world no. 20 in 1991 – 2 Grand Slam doubles titles → 1992 US Open champion • 1995 Australian Open champion • ranked world no. 1 in doubles
|-
|||1861||1899|| Great Britain|| 1983 ||  7 Grand Slam doubles titles → 1980/1881/1884/1885/1886/1888/1889 Wimbledon champion, all partnering twin brother William Renshaw
|-
|||1861||1904|| Great Britain|| 1983 ||  7 Grand Slam doubles titles → 1980/1881/1884/1885/1886/1888/1889 Wimbledon champion, partnering twin brother /Ernest Renshaw
|-
|||1903||1959|| United States|| 1961 ||1924 Olympic gold medalist
|-
|||1918||1995|| United States|| 1967 ||  3 Grand Slam singles titles → 1939 Wimbledon champion, 1939, 1941 U.S. champion  •  ranked world no. 1 for 3 years
|-
|||1941||–|||| ||1971 Australian Open quarterfinalist; 1971 doubles finalist • 1971 US Open quarterfinalist; 1976 doubles champion, 1975/1978 finalist • 1971 French Open doubles champion (w/Ashe) • 1969 Wimbledon doubles finalist • ranked world no. 11 in 1974
|-
|||1877||1959|| Great Britain|| ||1903(Ch), 1904(Ch), and 1906(Ch) Wimbledon finalist
|-
|||1870||1955|| Great Britain|| ||1902, 1903, 1904, and 1909(Ch) Wimbledon finalist
|-
|||1982||–|||| ||2003/2005/2007 French Open quarterfinalist • 2004 US Open doubles semifinalist • 2007 Australian Open quarterfinalist, 2003 doubles quarterfinalist • ranked world no. 7 in 2006
|-
|||1945||–|| Australia|| 1986 ||1966 French champion, 1965/1967 finalist • 1968 Wimbledon finalist • 1969/1970 U.S. Open finalist • 1964 Australian Championships quarterfinalist
|-
|||1981||–|| Belgium|| ||  1 Grand Slam doubles title → 2004 French Open champion, partnering Xavier Malisse • ranked world no. 24 in 2005
|-
|||1983||–|||| ||  1 Grand Slam doubles title → 2014 French Open champion, partnering Julien Benneteau
|-
|||1930||–|| Australia|| 2001 ||  2 Grand Slam singles titles → 1954 Australian champion • 1958 French champion  –  4 Grand Slam doubles title → 1952 and 1953 United States champion, partnering Vic Seixas and Rex Hartwig respectively • 1954 Australian Champion, partnering Hartwig • 1954 Wimbledon champion, partnering Hartwig – ranked world no.3 in 1958
|-
|||1934||–|| Australia|| 1980 ||  8 Grand Slam singles titles → 1953/1955/1971(O)/1972(O) Australian (Open) champion; 1953/1956/1972(O) doubles champion • 1953/1968(O) French (Open) champion • 1956/1970(O) US (Open) champion; 1956/1969(O) doubles champion • 1954/1956/1970(Open)/1974(O) Wimbledon finalist; 1953/1956 doubles champion • ranked world no.1 in 1961, 1962 and 1963
|-
|||1970||–|| Switzerland|| || 1 Grand Slam doubles title → 1992 French Open champion, partnering Jakob Hlasek
|-
|||1946||–|| Australia|| || 1 Grand Slam doubles title → 1977 Australian Open (Dec.) champion, partnering Allan Stone
|-
|||1973||–|| Great Britain|| ||1997 US Open finalist • 1997 Wimbledon quarterfinalist • ranked world no. 4 in 1997
|-
|||1905||1999|| United States|| 1963 ||  6 Grand Slam doubles titles → 1929, 1930, 1931 Wimbledon champion • 1931, 1935 U.S. champion •  1931 French champion
|- id=S
|||1965||–|||| ||3 Grand Slam doubles titles  → 1988, 1990 French Open champion with Andrés Gómez and Sergio Casal respectively • 1988 US Open champions with Casal.
|-
|||1938||–|||| 1984 || 1 Grand Slam doubles title → 1963 French champion
|-
|||1972||–|||| || 2 Grand Slam doubles titles → 2003/2004 Australian Open champion, both partnering Michaël Llodra — 1 Grand Slam mixed doubles title → 2005 French Open champion, partnering Daniela Hantuchová
|-
|||1908||1934|||| || 1931/1933 French championship semifinalist • 1932 Australian championship semifinalist • 1932/1933 Wimbledon semifinalist, 1931 quarterfinalist
|-
|||1927||–|||| 1976 ||  2 Grand Slam singles titles → 1951 Wimbledon champion • 1951 Australian champion • 1950/1951 U.S. semifinalist, 1956 quarterfinalist – ranked world no. 2
|-
|||1921||2006|||| 1966 ||  2 Grand Slam singles titles → 1942 U.S. champion, 1949 finalist • 1949 Wimbledon champion — 3 Grand Slam doubles titles → 1940/1941/1947 U.S. champion, all partnering Jack Kramer
|-
|||1976||–|||| ||2003 Australian Open finalist • 2008 Wimbledon semifinalist • 2003 Masters semifinalist • ranked world no. 5 in 2003
|-
|||1861||1943|| United States|| 1955 ||  6 Grand Slam doubles titles → 1882–1887 U.S. champion
|-
|||1927||–|| Australia|| 1979 ||  9 Grand Slam doubles titles and a calendar year Grand Slam (1951) → 1948/1951/1952 Wimbledon champion • 1950/1951 U.S. champion • 1951/1952 Australian champion • 1951/1952 French champion — 8 Grand Slam mixed doubles titles → 1949/1950 Australian champion • 1951/1952 French champion • 1951/1952 Wimbledon champion • 1951/1952 U.S. champion • considered world no. 1 amateur for 1952
|-
|||1930||–|| South Africa|| ||1964 Wimbledon quarterfinalist
|-
|||1921||–|||| 1984 ||1942/1943/1944/1945/1946/1947 U.S. semifinalist • considered world no. 1 professional for 1950 and 1952
|-
|||1963||–|||| ||  4 Grand Slam doubles titles → 1985 US Open champion • 1987/1988 Wimbledon champion • 1987 French Open champion
|-
|||1923||–|||| 1971 ||  5 Grand Slam doubles titles → 1955 Australian champion, partnering Tony Trabert • 1954, 1955 French champion with Tony Trabert • 1952, 1954 U.S. champion, partnering Mervyn Rose and Trabert respectively.
|-
|||1920|| 2021|| Australia ||  || 1 Grand Slam doubles titles → 1949 U.S. champion, partnering John Bromwich – ranked world no. 10 in 1949
|-
|||1928||1995|| Italy|| || 1 Grand Slam doubles titles → 1959 French champion, partnering Nicola Pietrangeli
|-
|||1906||1994|||| ||Ranked no. 2 in professional tennis in 1941
|-
|||1968||2008|| Austria|| ||Ranked world no. 18 in 1990
|-
|||1862||1949|| United States|| 1955 ||  2 Grand Slam singles titles → 1888/1889 U.S. champion, 1887/1890 finalist — 1 Grand Slam doubles title → 1889 U.S. champion
|-
|||1955||–|| Czechoslovakia|| ||Ranked world no. 12 in 1984
|-
|||1956||–|| Czechoslovakia|| ||Ranked world no. 11 in 1984
|-
|||1946||–|||| 1987 ||  2 Grand Slam singles titles → 1971 US Open champion • 1972 Wimbledon champion • 1971/1972 French Open quarterfinalist • 1970 Masters champion • ranked world no. 1 for 1972 (year-end)
|-
|||1872||1947|| Great Britain|| ||1899, 1900(Ch), 1905 Wimbledon finalist •  2 Grand Slam doubles titles → 1902, 1906 Wimbledon champion
|-
|||1992||-|||| ||  1 Grand Slam doubles title and 1 Grand Slam mixed doubles title → 2014 Wimbledon doubles champion, partnering Vasek Pospisil • 2011 US Open mixed doubles champion, partnering Melanie Oudin
|-
|||1984||–|| Sweden|| ||2009/2010 French Open finalist • 2009 Masters semifinalist • ranked world no. 4 in 2010
|-
|||1952||–|||| ||Ranked world no. 5 in 1980
|-
|||1974||–|||| ||1999 Australian Open quarterfinalist • ranked world no. 18 in 2005
|-
|||1872||1947|| South Africa|| ||1927 French Championships singles semifinalist, 1926 Wimbledon singles quarterfinalist •  2 Grand Slam mixed doubles titles → 1928 Wimbledon champion, partnering Elizabeth Ryan, 1931 French champion, partnering Betty Nuthall
|-
|||1971||–|||| ||
|-
|||1904||1992|| Italy|| ||1932 French Championships singles finalist, 1935 Australian Championships singles quarterfinalist
|-
|||1967||–|| Sweden|| ||Ranked world no. 23 in 1987
|-
|||1978||–|| Czech Republic|| ||2006 Wimbledon quarterfinalist • ranked world no. 8 in 2006
|-
|||1946||–|||| ||  3 Grand Slam doubles titles → 1976/1982 French Open champion • 1984 Australian Open champion
|-
|||1968||–|||| ||  1 Grand Slam doubles titles → 1992 Wimbledon champion, partnering John McEnroe
|-
|||1951||–|||| ||1974 Wimbledon semifinalist • 1976/1977 US Open quarterfinalist
|-
|||1911||1970|||| ||1934 U.S. Championships semifinalist, 1934 and 1935 doubles winner
|-
|||1938||–|| Australia|| 1985 ||1969 Australian Open quarterfinalist • 1969 French Open quarterfinalist • 1969/1972 US Open quarterfinalist
|-
|||1970||–|| Australia|| || 1 Grand Slam doubles title → 1998 U.S. Open champion, partnering Cyril Suk.
|-
|||1945||–|| Australia|| ||1971 Australian Open semifinalist — 2 Grand Slam doubles titles → 1968/1977[Dec] Australian Open champion
|-
|||1920||2004|| South Africa|| ||
|-
|||1967||–|| Czechoslovakia /  Czech Republic|| ||  1 Grand Slam doubles title → 1998 U.S. Open champion, partnering Sandon Stolle — 4 Grand Slam mixed doubles titles → 1991 French Open champion, partnering sister Helena Suková • 1992/1996/1997 Wimbledon champion, the first partnering Larisa Neiland, the other two with Suková
|- id=T
|||1918||1999|| United States|| 1967 || 5 Grand Slam doubles titles → 1942, 1945, 1946, 1948 U.S. champion, partnering Gardnar Mulloy • 1950 French champion, partnering Tony Trabert.
|-
|||1954||–|| Hungary|| || 2 Grand Slam doubles titles → 1981 French Open champion  • 1985 Wimbledon champion both partnering Heinz Günthardt
|-
|||1865||?|| United States|| || 1 Grand Slam doubles title → 1889 U.S. champion, partnering Henry Slocum
|-
|||1941||–|| United Kingdom|| || 2 Grand Slam doubles titles → 1971, 1972 US Open champion, partnering John Newcombe and Cliff Drysdale respectively
|-
|||1985||–|| Romania|| ||  1 Grand Slam doubles title and 1 Grand Slam mixed doubles title → 2015 Wimbledon doubles champion, partnering Jean-Julien Rojer • 2012 Australian Open mixed doubles champion, partnering Bethanie Mattek-Sands
|-
|||1959||–|||| || 1 Grand Slam doubles title → 1983 French Open champion, partnering Barbara Jordan
|-
|||1893||1953|||| 1959 ||  10 Grand Slam singles titles → 1920/1921/1922/1923/1924/1925/1929 U.S. champion • 1920/1921/1930 Wimbledon champion • 7 times world no. 1
|-
|||1939||–|| Romania|| 2013 ||  1 Grand Slam doubles title → 1970  French Open champion, partnering Ilie Năstase
|-
|||1930||–|||| 1970 || 5 Grand Slam doubles titles → 1950/1954/1955 French champion, the first partnering Bill Talbert, the other two with Vic Seixas • 1954 U.S. champion, partnering Seixas • 1955 Australian champion, partnering Seixas
|- id=U
|||1972||–|| Zimbabwe|| ||  2 Grand Slam doubles titles → 2001 US Open champion with Wayne Black • 2005 Australian Open champion with Black • 2008 Wimbledon finalist with Jonas Björkman — 1 Grand Slam mixed doubles title → 2002 Australian Open champion (with Daniela Hantuchová)
|- id=V
|||1962||–|| South Africa|| || 1 Grand Slam doubles title → 1985 Australian Open champion, partnering Paul Annacone
|-
|||1983||–|||| ||2009 Australian Open semifinalist • 2013 Wimbledon quarterfinalist • ranked world no. 7 in 2009
|-
|||1911||1994|| United States|| 1962 || 2 Grand Slam doubles titles → 1932 U.S. champion • 1933 Australian Champion, both with Keith Gledhill • 1 Grand Slam mixed doubles titles → 1933 U.S. champion, partnering Elizabeth Ryan
|-
|||1961||–|| South Africa|| ||  3 Grand Slam doubles titles → 1990/1993 Australian Open champion, the first partnering Pieter Aldrich, the second with Laurie Warder • 1990 US Open champion, partnering Aldrich
|- id=W
|||1878||1961|||| 1956 || 6 Grand Slam doubles title → 1899–1901, 1904–1906 US champion, partnering Dwight F. Davis (1898, 1899, 1901) and Beals Wright (1904, 1905, 1906)
|-
|||1962||–|| Australia|| ||  1 Grand Slam doubles title → 1993 Australian Open champion with Danie Visser
|-
|||1876||1914|||| || 2 Grand Slam doubles title → 1897, 1898 US Champion, partnering George Sheldon
|-
|||1952||–|||| ||4 Grand Slam doubles titles → 1978, 1980, 1981 Australian Open champion, the first with Wojtek Fibak, the last two with Mark Edmondson •  1985 French Open champion with Mark Edmondson 
|-
|||1985||–|||| || 1 Olympic doubles gold medal → 2008 gold medalist with Roger Federer
|-
|||1964||–|||| 2002 ||  1 Grand Slam doubles title → 1986 Wimbledon champion with Joakim Nyström
|-
|||1883||1915|||| 1978 ||  6 Grand Slam singles titles → 1906/1909 Australian champion, 1910/1911/1912/1913 Wimbledon champion
|-
|||1891||1968|||| || 1 Grand Slam doubles title → 1920 Wimbledon champion, partnering Chuck Garland — 1 Olympic mixed doubles gold medal → 1924 gold medalist with Hazel Hotchkiss Wightman.
|-
|||1971||–|||| 2010 || 16 Grand Slam doubles titles (record) → 1995/1996/2003 US Open champion the first two with Mark Woodforde, the third with Jonas Björkman • 1992/1997/2001 Australian Open champion the first two with Woodforde, the third with Björkman • 1993/1994/1995/1996/1997/2000/2002/2003/2004 Wimbledon champion the first six with Woodforde, the last three with Björkman • 2000 French Open champion with Woodforde • 1996 Olympic gold medal with Woodforde • 1992/1996 Masters champion with Woodforde — 6 Grand Slam mixed doubles titles → 1990/1993/2001 US Open champion the first with Elizabeth Smylie, the second with Helena Suková, and the third with Rennae Stubbs • 1993 Australian Open champion with Arantxa Sánchez Vicario • 1994 Wimbledon champion with Suková • 1995 French Open champion with Larisa SavchenkoSee also: The Woodies
|-
|||1965||–|||| 2010 || 12 Grand Slam doubles titles → 1989/1995/1996 US Open champion, the first partnering John McEnroe, the second and third with Todd Woodbridge • 1992/1997 Australian Open champion, both partnering Woodbridge • 1993/1994/1995/1996/1997/2000 Wimbledon champion, all partnering Woodbridge • 2000 French Open champion, partnering Woodbridge • 1996 Olympic gold medal, partnering Woodbridge • 1992/1996 Masters champion, partnering Woodbridge — 5 Grand Slam mixed doubles titles → 1992/1996 Australian Open champion, both partnering Nicole Provis • 1992 French Open champion, partnering Arantxa Sánchez Vicario • 1992 US Open champion, partnering Provis • 1993 Wimbledon champion, partnering Martina NavratilovaSee also: The Woodies
|-
|||1873||1925|||| 1955 ||  1 Grand Slam doubles title → 1895, partnering Malcolm Chance
|-
|||1879||1925|||| 1956 ||  3 Grand Slam doubles title → 1904, 1905 and 1906, partnering Holcombe Ward • 1 Olympic Gold doubles medal → 1904
|- id=Z
|||1976||–|| Serbia|| ||  3 Grand Slam doubles titles → 2008/2009 Wimbledon champion (partnering Daniel Nestor); 2010 French Open champion (with Nestor); 2010 Australian Open finalist, partnering Nestor • 4 Grand Slam mixed doubles titles → 2004/2008 Australian Open champion the first with Elena Bovina, the second with Sun Tiantian • 2006/2010 French Open champion (both with Katarina Srebotnik'') • ranked world  no. 1
|-
|||1963||–|| Yugoslavia|| ||1985 Australian Open semifinalist (first appearance) • 1986 Wimbledon semifinalist, 1987 quarterfinalist
|}

See also

 List of male singles tennis players
 List of female tennis players
 Lists of tennis players
 Lists of sportspeople

Notes

References